Hunt sabotage is the direct action that animal rights activists and animal liberation activists undertake to interfere with hunting activity. 

Anti-hunting campaigners are divided into hunt saboteurs and anti-hunt monitors to monitor for cruelty and report violations of animal welfare laws. 
 Interventionists usually use citronella sprays to mask the scent of the animal the hounds and hunters track or use sound and visual distractions to prevent the hunters from being successful, destroy hunting towers and enter hunting estates and farms to disarm animal traps. 

 Non-interventionists use video, photography and witness statements to support prosecution of hunters who commit offenses or to raise awareness of issues they consider show hunting as cruel, ineffective or in a bad light.
Both hunt saboteurs and independent monitors share similar techniques as both hunt saboteurs and independent monitors document and support the prosecution of those caught illegally hunting. The methods of documentation used by both saboteurs and monitors are usually videoing and photographing the illegal activities conducted by the hunt.

By country 

In the United Kingdom the interventionists are usually members of the Hunt Saboteurs Association, or independent hunt saboteurs or independent anti hunt groups while the non-interventionists are often members of the League Against Cruel Sports or, more recently, Protect Our Wild Animals or the International Fund for Animal Welfare. 

Every year in Spain, organisations such as Equanimal or the platform Matar por matar, non are involved in the sabotage of the Copa Nacional de Caza del Zorro (Spanish: "National Fox Hunt Cup") following the hunters making noise with megaphones to scare foxes and preventing them from being killed.

References

Further reading 
Books

Animal rights movement
Gun politics